The Macleay River railway bridge, also known as the Kempsey rail bridge over Macleay River, is a heritage-listed railway bridge that carries the North Coast railway across the Macleay River from Kempsey to South Kempsey, both in the Kempsey Shire, New South Wales, Australia. The property is owned by Transport Asset Holding Entity of New South Wales (TAHE), a state-owned corporation of the Government of New South Wales. It was added to the New South Wales State Heritage Register on 2 April 1999.

History 

The bridge was built in 1917 along with the extension of the North Coast line to Kempsey. The steelwork for the bridge was made at the Walsh Island Dockyard and Engineering Works and transported to the bridge site by steamer.

The bridge was damaged in floods in 1949 and 1950. It was initially proposed to replace the entire bridge as a result, but this proposal had been abandoned by 1953.

In 1966 the bridge spans were raised by  due to the 1950s floods, with new pre-cast concrete approaches constructed.

Description 

The bridge is a steel Pratt truss bridge with consisting of three  steel spans and two  plate girder spans. It was built with steel approaches, with the pre-cast concrete approaches added later when the bridge was raised.

Heritage listing 
The Macleay River bridge is one of the major river crossings on the North Coast railway line. When opened in 1917, the crossing of the river was achieved by 3  steel truss spans, approached by timber trestles.

The Kempsey rail bridge over the Macleay River was listed on the New South Wales State Heritage Register on 2 April 1999 having satisfied the following criteria.

The place possesses uncommon, rare or endangered aspects of the cultural or natural history of New South Wales.

This item is assessed as historically rare. This item is assessed as architecturally rare. This item is assessed as socially rare.

See also 

List of railway bridges in New South Wales

References

Attribution

External links

New South Wales State Heritage Register
Railway bridges in New South Wales
Articles incorporating text from the New South Wales State Heritage Register
Bridges completed in 1917
1917 establishments in Australia
Mid North Coast
Kempsey, New South Wales
Truss bridges in Australia
Steel bridges in Australia
North Coast railway line, New South Wales